The Volleyball 2017–18 V.Premier League Women's will be the 24th tournament of the V.Premier League which will be held from October 21, 2017 – March 4, 2018.

Teams

Personnel and sponsoring

Season standing procedure
 Match points
 Number of matches won
 Sets ratio
 Points ratio
 Result of the last match between the tied teams

Match won 3–0 or 3–1: 3 match points for the winner, 0 match points for the loser
Match won 3–2: 2 match points for the winner, 1 match point for the loser

League table

Standings

Result table

Results

1 Leg

Matchday 1

Matchday 2

Matchday 3

Matchday 4

Matchday 5

Matchday 6

Matchday 7

2 Leg

Matchday 8

Matchday 9

Matchday 10

Matchday 11

Matchday 12

Matchday 13

Matchday 14

3 Leg

Matchday 15

Matchday 16

Matchday 17

Matchday 18

Matchday 19

Matchday 20

Matchday 21

Matchday 22

Matchday 23

Playoff

Final 6

Final 6 standing procedure
 Total points (match points of final6 and the ranking points of regular season)
 The rank of regular season

Ranking points of regular season
1st place - 5point
2nd place - 4point
3rd place - 3point
4th place - 2point
5th place - 1point
6th place - 0point

Match won 3–0 or 3–1: 3 match points for the winner, 0 match points for the loser
Match won 3–2: 2 match points for the winner, 1 match point for the loser

Standings

Result

Matchday 1

Matchday 2

Matchday 3

Final 3 / Final

Final 3

Final

Final standing

Awards

Most Valuable Player
  Yuki Ishii (Hisamitsu)
Excellent  Player
  Brankica Mihajlović (JT)
Allstar Team
  Yuki Ishii (Hisamitsu)
  Brankica Mihajlović (JT)
  Neriman Gençyürek (TAB)
  Foluke Akinradewo (Hisamitsu)
  Erika Araki (TAB)
  Misaki Tanaka (JT)
  Mako Kobata (JT)
Best coach
  Shingo Sakai (Hisamitsu)
New face award
  Ai Kurogo (Toray)
 Best scorer
  Neriman Gençyürek (TAB) 580points
 Spike award
  Foluke Akinradewo (Hisamitsu) 60.3%
 Block award
  Erika Araki (TAB) 0.85points/set
 Service award
  Yuka Kanasugi (JT) 17.4%
 Reception award
  Risa Shinnabe  (Hisamitsu) 63.0%
 Receive award
  Yuki Ishii (Hisamitsu)
 Special award (played more than 230 matches)
  Moemi Tōi (Hitachi)

See also
2017–18 V.Premier League Men's

References

External links
 Official website 

V.Premier League Women
V.Premier League Women
Women's
Women's volleyball in Japan
2017 in Japanese sport
2018 in Japanese sport